The Tiga GC286 is a sports prototype race car, designed, developed, and built by British manufacturer Tiga Race Cars, for sports car racing, conforming to the Group C2 rules and regulations, in 1986.

References

Sports prototypes
Group C cars